Jay Amitbhai Shah (born 22 September 1988) is an Indian businessman and cricket administrator. He became the Board of Control for Cricket in India (BCCI) Secretary in 2019. He is also the president of Asian Cricket Council. He is the son of Amit Shah, India's Minister of Home Affairs.

Early life
Jay Shah was born to Amit Shah, an Indian politician of the Bharatiya Janata Party, and Sonal Shah on 22 September 1988. He graduated from Nirma University with a B.Tech. He underwent cricket training in Ahmedabad under Jayendra Sehgal.

Career
Shah worked as one of the directors of Temple Enterprise, a company which was founded in 2004 and involved in the trade of agricultural products. The company shut operations in October 2016. Shah owns a 60 per cent stake in Kusum Finserve which was established in 2015.

After serving as an executive board member of the Central Board of Cricket, Ahmedabad, starting 2009, Shah became the joint secretary of the Gujarat Cricket Association (GCA) in September 2013. During his tenure as joint secretary, he oversaw GCA's construction of the Narendra Modi Stadium, in Ahmedabad, along with his father Amit Shah who was GCA president at the time.

Shah became a member of the finance and marketing committees of the Board of Control for Cricket in India (BCCI) in 2015. He stepped down from the position of GCA joint secretary in September 2019. The following month, he was elected as the secretary of BCCI for a one-and-a-half-year term and the youngest of the five office bearers. In December 2019, the BCCI selected Shah as its representative for future CEC meetings of International Cricket Council. In January 2021, Asian Cricket Council appointed Shah as President.

Personal life
In February 2015, Shah married Rishita Patel, his college girlfriend, in a traditional Gujarati ceremony. The wedding was attended by Prime Minister Narendra Modi and other high-ranking public officials.

Controversies

Defamation case against The Wire

Shah filed a criminal defamation case and a civil lawsuit of 100 crore against the editors of The Wire who, in an October 2017 article, reported that Shah's company's revenue increased 16,000 times one year after Narendra Modi became the Indian Prime Minister. In 2018, the Gujarat High Court restored a gag order, earlier placed by a civil court, on the website, preventing it from publishing any content connecting Shah's businesses to Modi. In August 2019, The Wire withdrew its appeal against the criminal defamation case and announced that it will stand trial.

References

Living people
People from Ahmedabad
Indian cricket administrators
1988 births